İbrahim Aydemir (born 19 May 1983 in Augsburg, West Germany) is a Turkish footballer. He plays as a striker for SV Heimstetten.

Club career 

Aydemir previously played for Sivasspor in the Süper Lig during the 2005–06 season, and had stints with Samsunspor in the TFF First League and Etimesgut Şekerspor in the TFF Second League. He also had a brief spell with Unterhaching in the 2. Bundesliga.

References 

1983 births
Living people
Turkish footballers
Turkey B international footballers
Turkey youth international footballers
SpVgg Unterhaching players
Sivasspor footballers
Samsunspor footballers
Turanspor footballers
VfB Stuttgart II players
German people of Turkish descent
2. Bundesliga players
Süper Lig players
Members of the 25th Parliament of Turkey
Association football forwards
SpVgg Unterhaching II players
SV Heimstetten players
Türkgücü München players
Sportspeople from Augsburg